The 2006 Southern Illinois Salukis football team represented Southern Illinois University as a member of the Gateway Football Conference during the 2006 NCAA Division I FCS football season. They were led by sixth-year head coach Jerry Kill and played their home games at McAndrew Stadium in Carbondale, Illinois. The Salukis finished the season with a 9–4 record overall and a 4–3 record in conference play. The team received an at-large bid to the FCS playoffs, where they defeated  before losing to Montana in the quarterfinals. Southern Illinois was ranked No. 7 in The Sports Network's postseason ranking of FCS teams.

Schedule

References

Southern Illinois
Southern Illinois Salukis football seasons
Southern Illinois Salukis football